For the 73rd Congress (March 4, 1933 – January 3, 1935), Kentucky did not use a district election format, but instead, elected all representatives in a statewide, at-large manner. The district format was returned during the 74th Congress and has been used in all congressional sessions thereafter. On September 3, 1932 United States District Judge Andrew M. J. Cochran of the United States District Court for the Eastern District of Kentucky ruled in favor of the plaintiff in Hume v. Mahan, 1 F. Supp. 142 - Dist. Court, ED Kentucky 1932, striking down the "Kentucky Redistricting Act of 1932" passed by the Kentucky General Assembly that had established at-large congressional elections for the 1932 general election.

List of members representing the district 
All served March 4, 1933 to January 3, 1935.

Election results

References

 
 
 Congressional Biographical Directory of the United States 1774–present

Former congressional districts of the United States
At-large
At-large United States congressional districts
Constituencies established in 1933
1933 establishments in Kentucky
Constituencies disestablished in 1935
1935 disestablishments in Kentucky